Dichaeta is a subgenus of flies belonging to the family Ephydridae.

Species
Notiphila caudata (Fallén, 1813)

References

Ephydridae
Taxa named by Johann Wilhelm Meigen
Insect subgenera